Mahat is a Sanskrit word meaning "large" or "great". It may refer to:

 Mahat (surname), a Nepalese surname
 Mahat, Eastern Rukum, a village in Nepal
 Mahat Gaun, a locality in Nepal
 Mahat Raghavendra, Indian actor
 Mahat-tattva, Hinduism

See also
 Kon-mahat, Burma